This page shows the results of the Judo Competition for men and women at the 1991 Pan American Games, held from August 2 to August 18, 1991 in Havana, Cuba. There were nine weight divisions, for both men and women.

Medal table

Men's competition

Men's Flyweight (– 56 kg)

Men's Bantamweight (– 60 kg)

Men's Featherweight (– 65 kg)

Men's Lightweight (– 71 kg)

Men's Light Middleweight (– 78 kg)

Men's Middleweight (– 86 kg)

Men's Light Heavyweight (– 95 kg)

Men's Heavyweight (+ 95 kg)

Men's Open

Women's competition

Women's Flyweight (– 45 kg)

Women's Extra Lightweight (– 48 kg)

Women's Half Lightweight (– 52 kg)

Women's Lightweight (– 56 kg)

Women's Half Middleweight (– 61 kg)

Women's Middleweight (– 66 kg)

Women's Half Heavyweight (– 72 kg)

Women's Heavyweight (+ 72 kg)

Women's Open

References
 Sports 123

Events at the 1991 Pan American Games
American Games
1991
Judo competitions in Cuba
International sports competitions hosted by Cuba